"Jesse Hold On" is a song by Irish girl group B*Witched. It was released on 4 October 1999 as the lead single from their second studio album Awake and Breathe (1999). The single reached number six on the Irish Singles Chart, and despite being the band's first single to miss the number-one spot on the UK Singles Chart, it was a commercial success, peaking at number four and receiving a Silver certification from the British Phonographic Industry for shipments of over 200,000.

Music video
The music video was filmed at Pacific Southwest Railway Museum in Campo, California and was directed by Andy Morahan.

Track listings

UK CD1
 "Jesse Hold On" – 3:20
 "Coming Around Again" – 3:36
 "Jesse Hold On" (karaoke version) – 3:15
 "Jesse Hold On" (video)

UK CD2
 "Jesse Hold On" – 3:20
 "Jesse Hold On" (The Bold & The Beautiful Glamourmix) – 6:46
 "Jesse Hold On" (The HB Source Upfront mix) – 6:13

UK cassette single
 "Jesse Hold On" – 3:20
 "Jesse Hold On" (The HB Source 7-inch Upfront mix) – 3:20

European CD single
 "Jesse Hold On" – 3:20
 "Coming Around Again" – 3:36

Australia CD single
 "Jesse Hold On" – 3:20
 "Coming Around Again" – 3:36
 "Jesse Hold On" (karaoke version) – 3:15
 "Jesse Hold On" (The Bold & The Beautiful Glamourmix) – 6:46
 "Jesse Hold On" (The HB Source Upfront mix) – 6:13

Credits and personnel
Credits are lifted from the Awake and Breathe album booklet.

Studio
 Produced in Ray "Madman" Hedges' Mothership

Personnel

 Edele Lynch – writing
 Keavy Lynch – writing
 Sinéad O'Carroll – writing
 Lindsay Armaou – writing
 Ray Hedges – writing, production, arrangement
 Martin Brannigan – writing, arrangement
 Robert Hodgens – writing, guitar
 Erwin Keiles – guitar
 Cutfather & Joe – additional production and remix

Charts

Weekly charts

Year-end charts

Certifications

References

1999 songs
1999 singles
B*Witched songs
Epic Records singles
Music videos directed by Andy Morahan
Song recordings produced by Ray Hedges
Songs written by Martin Brannigan
Songs written by Ray Hedges